Barbara Jo Lawrence (February 24, 1930 – November 13, 2013) was an American model, actress, and real estate agent.

Early years
Born to Morris and Bernice ( Eaton) Lawrence in Carnegie, Oklahoma, She won a Tiny Tot beauty contest when she was three years old.

Career

Lawrence's career began as a child photographer's model. She appeared in her first film, Billy Rose's Diamond Horseshoe (1945), as a night-club patron. A year later, she made a strong impression in her second film at 20th Century-Fox, Margie, in which she played outgoing flapper Maryville. She was featured in the swashbuckler Captain from Castile (1947) with Tyrone Power. While finishing her studies at UCLA, she attracted the attention of talent scouts, and Lawrence was soon featured in a number of additional 20th Century-Fox movies, including You Were Meant for Me, Give My Regards to Broadway, A Letter to Three Wives, The Street with No Name, and Thieves' Highway.  At Universal in the early 1950s were Peggy and Here Come the Nelsons. She also a star in Columbia Pictures' romantic comedy Paris Model (1953).

Upon moving to MGM, Lawrence appeared with Gig Young in the 3D movie Arena (1953) and in Her Twelve Men (with Greer Garson). She played the role of Gertie Cummings in the film version of Oklahoma!, in which she gets into a knockdown catfight with Gloria Grahame ("Ado Annie"). She starred in Man with the Gun (1955) that year. In 1956, she  appeared as Lola McQuilan in the western TV series Cheyenne in the episode titled "The Last Train West." In 1957, she starred in Kronos (with Jeff Morrow). Although the science-fiction film was not praised by critics at the time, it eventually attracted a cult following for its imaginative storyline and special effects. 

Between 1958 and 1962, Lawrence made four guest appearances on the CBS-TV series Perry Mason.  In 1958 she played Ellen Waring in "The Half-Wakened Wife", and Gloria Barton in "The Case of the Jilted Jockey." In 1961 she played murderess Lori Stoner in "The Case of the Envious Editor", and in 1962 she played Agnes Theilman in "The Case of the Shapely Shadow". In 1958 she guest-starred in Cimarron City (TV series), in the second episode "Terror Town". In 1960, she guest starred as Della Thompson in the Bonanza episode "The Abduction".

Personal life
In 1947, Lawrence married actor Jeffrey Stone. This was kept secret until June 28, 1947, when Lawrence's mother threw her daughter a church wedding in Beverly Hills, but the marriage ended with a divorce granted on September 28, 1949.

On July 29, 1951, she wed John Murphy; the couple had two children before divorcing in 1957. After marrying Lester R. Nelson in 1961, she had two more children. She made several more television appearances in 1962, then retired from acting altogether. She and Nelson divorced in 1976.

Death
Lawrence died of kidney failure on November 13, 2013, aged 83, in Los Angeles, California, but her death was not reported until January 3, 2014.

Legacy
Lawrence has a star at 1735 Vine Street in the Television section of the Hollywood Walk of Fame. It was dedicated on February 8, 1960.

Filmography

References

External links
 
 
 New York Times obituary for Barbara Lawrence, January 3, 2014; accessed January 4, 2014.

1930 births
2013 deaths
American women writers
American film actresses
American television actresses
Actresses from Oklahoma
Actresses from Kansas City, Missouri
People from Carnegie, Oklahoma
Writers from Missouri
Writers from Oklahoma
Deaths from kidney failure
20th-century American actresses
21st-century American women